

The Air Tractor AT-602 is an agricultural aircraft manufactured by Air Tractor Inc, that first flew in the United States on 1December 1995. Of monoplane low-wing, taildragger configuration, it carries a chemical hopper between the engine firewall and the cockpit. It was designed to fill a gap in the Air Tractor range, between the AT-500 series with a 500 US gal (1,890 L) capacity and the AT-802 with a 810 US gal (3,070 L) capacity.

Operators
Australia
Dunn Aviation (Western Australia) – 2 x AT-602s
Mongolia
Thomas Air LLC (Mongolia) – AT-602

Specifications

See also

References

Citations

General sources
 Jackson, Paul. Jane's All The World's Aircraft 2003–2004. Coulsdon, UK: Jane's Information Group, 2003. .
 Taylor, Michael J. H. Brassey's World Aircraft & Systems Directory 1999/2000. London: Brassey's, 1999. .
 Airliners.net
 Manufacturer's Website

External links

 http://www.airtractor.com/

AT-602
1990s United States agricultural aircraft
Single-engined tractor aircraft
Single-engined turboprop aircraft
Low-wing aircraft
Aircraft first flown in 1995